Alonzo Lawrence (born October 15, 1989) is an American football defensive back who is currently a free agent. Lawrence first enrolled at the University of Alabama before transferring to the University of Southern Mississippi and lastly arriving at Mississippi Gulf Coast Community College. He attended George County High School in Lucedale, Mississippi. He has been a member of the Detroit Lions, Saskatchewan Roughriders, Toronto Argonauts and Edmonton Eskimos.

College career
Lawrence spent his redshirt freshman season at the University of Alabama. He transferred to the University of Southern Mississippi the next season but did not play. He later played two years at Mississippi Gulf Coast Community College and was a NJCAA All-American in 2011.

Professional career

Detroit Lions
Lawrence was signed by the Detroit Lions on April 30, 2012. He was released  by the Lions on June 22, 2012.

Saskatchewan Roughriders
Lawrence signed with the Saskatchewan Roughriders on August 27, 2012 and spent the 2012 season on the Roughriders' practice squad.

Toronto Argonauts
Lawrence was signed by the Toronto Argonauts on May 29, 2013. He was named Defensive Player of the Week for Week Seven of the 2013 season.
Lawrence was released by the Argonauts on June 21, 2014.

Edmonton Eskimos
Lawrence was signed by the Edmonton Eskimos on July 14, 2014. He was released by the Eskimos on June 13, 2015.

References

External links
Just Sports Stats
Edmonton Eskimos profile 
NFL Draft Scout

1989 births
Living people
African-American players of American football
African-American players of Canadian football
American football defensive backs
Canadian football defensive backs
Edmonton Elks players
Mississippi Gulf Coast Bulldogs football players
People from Lucedale, Mississippi
Players of American football from Dallas
Players of Canadian football from Dallas
Toronto Argonauts players
University of Alabama alumni
University of Southern Mississippi alumni
21st-century African-American sportspeople
20th-century African-American people